Souleymane Dembélé (born 3 September 1984) is a Malian football player, currently playing for Stade Malien.

International 
He was part of the Mali U-23 team who finish third in group stage of 2003 FIFA World Youth Championship.

Dembélé was selected for the 2008 Africa Cup of Nations. He made his debut with the senior side in a 2006 FIFA World Cup qualifying match against Liberia on 5 June 2005.

References

External links

1984 births
Living people
Malian footballers
Mali international footballers
Mali under-20 international footballers
Olympic footballers of Mali
Expatriate footballers in Morocco
Footballers at the 2004 Summer Olympics
2008 Africa Cup of Nations players
AS Bamako players
Malian expatriate footballers
Stade Malien players
Djoliba AC players
Fath Union Sport players
Sportspeople from Bamako
Association football midfielders
21st-century Malian people